Czemierniki  is a village in Radzyń Podlaski County, Lublin Voivodeship, in eastern Poland. It is the seat of the gmina (administrative district) called Gmina Czemierniki.

The village has a population of 1,700.

Jewish Community 
The Jewish population numbered 1,004 Jews in 1921. Around 1,000 Jews were put into the Czemierniki ghetto, established by the Nazis in 1940. In 1942, Czemierniki Jews were sent to the Parczew ghetto, and then to the Treblinka Concentration Camp.  Few Jews survived.

References

Villages in Radzyń Podlaski County
Lublin Governorate
Holocaust locations in Poland